Conasprella guidopoppei is a species of sea snail, a marine gastropod mollusk in the family Conidae, the cone snails and their allies.

Like all species within the genus Conasprella, these snails are predatory and venomous. They are capable of "stinging" humans, therefore live ones should be handled carefully or not at all.

Description
The size of the shell varies between 20 mm and 35 mm.

Distribution
This marine species occurs off Palawan, the Philippines.

References

 Raybaudi Massilia G. (2005) The first discovered Pacific Ocean member of the Conus traversianus group: Conus guidopoppei new species. Visaya 1(5): 143–148
 Puillandre N., Duda T.F., Meyer C., Olivera B.M. & Bouchet P. (2015). One, four or 100 genera? A new classification of the cone snails. Journal of Molluscan Studies. 81: 1–23.

External links
 The Conus Biodiversity website
 Cone Shells – Knights of the Sea
 

guidopoppei
Gastropods described in 2005